The canoe polo competition at the 2022 World Games took place in July 2022, in Birmingham in United States, at the Birmingham CrossPlex. Originally scheduled to take place in July 2021, the Games were rescheduled for July 2022 as a result of the 2020 Summer Olympics postponement due to the COVID-19 pandemic.

Qualification

Due to the COVID-19 pandemic, the 2021 ICF canoe polo world championships, that would have served as the qualification event for The World Games, were cancelled. Therefore, on October 25 of 2021, the International Canoe Federation announced that Eight men’s teams and eight women’s teams had been officially invited to compete. The teams were chosen based on the results of the 2018 ICF canoe polo world championships.

Participating nations

Medal table

Medalists

References

External links
 The World Games 2022
 Planet Canoe
 Results book

 
2022 World Games